Barfian or Barfeyan or Barfiyan may refer to:
 Barfiyan, Hamadan
 Barfian, Markazi